Piero Gemelli (born 1952) is an Italian photographer and artist.

Life and work
Gemelli was born in Rome. He studied architecture and taught photography and advertising at the European Institute of Design until 1982. As a photographer, he started out creating advertising images and programs in multivision. In 1982, Gemelli moved to Milan where he worked for Vogue Italia and other international magazines. He opened a studio in Milan in 1987.

Gemelli has displayed his work in exhibitions worldwide and it has been credited in various articles and publications.

In 1987, he received a Merit Award for Magazine Features. He also wrote a book Piero Gemelli Fotografie 1983–1993, published by Art Studio/Idea Books.
 
Today Gemelli works between Milan, Paris, and New York City. In addition to his photographic work, he works as art director, exposition planning consultant, and video and commercials director.

Exhibitions
20 anni di VogueItalia 1964-1984 (Milano, 1985) 
À propos de la photographie italienne (Musée de l’Elysée, Losanna -1992)
Idea Progettata-fotografie 1983–1993 (Milano, 1994)
Lo sguardo Italiano - fotografie di moda dal 1951 a oggi, (Rotonda Besana, Milano 2005)
Dettagli di Moda (Villa Filippini-Besana Brianza, October 2009)
W(H)O-MAN (MyOwnGallery, Milano  January 2010)

References

External links
 Marie Claire
 MyOwnGallery
 UltraFragola
 UltraFragola
 youtube.com
 Piero Gemelli site

Photographers from Milan
Living people
1952 births